The First Federal Electoral District of Campeche (I Distrito Electoral Federal de Campeche) is one of the 300 Electoral Districts into which Mexico is divided for the purpose of elections to the federal Chamber of Deputies and one of two such districts in the state of Campeche.

It elects one deputy to the lower house of Congress for each three-year legislative period, by means of the first past the post system.

District territory
It covers the municipalities of Calakmul, Calkiní, Campeche, Hecelchakán, Hopelchén and Tenabo, in the north and east of the state.

The district's head town (cabecera distrital), where results from individual polling stations are gathered together and collated, is the state capital,  Campeche, Camp.

Deputies returned to Congress from this district

L Legislature
 1976–1979:  Abelardo Carrillo Zavala (PRI)
LI Legislature
 1979–1982:
LII Legislature
 1982–1985:
LIII Legislature
 1985–1988:
LIV Legislature
 1988–1991:
LV Legislature
 1991–1994:
LVI Legislature
 1994–1997:  Manuel Pacheco Arjona (PRI)
LVII Legislature
 1997–2000:  Ramón Félix Santini Pech (PRI)
LVIII Legislature
 2000–2003:  Edilberto Jesús Buenfin Montalvo (PRI)
LIX Legislature
 2003–2006:  Enrique Escalante Arceo (PRI)
LX Legislature
 2006–2009:  Víctor Manuel Méndez Lanz (PRI)

References

Federal electoral districts of Mexico
Campeche